Mesochariodes is a genus of moths of the family Tortricidae.

Species
Mesochariodes armifera Razowski & Becker, 2015
Mesochariodes micropollex Razowski & Wojtusiak, 2008
Mesochariodes obrimospina Razowski & Becker, 2015
Mesochariodes ochyrosetaria Razowski & Becker, 2015
Mesochariodes polytrichta Razowski & Wojtusiak, 2006
Mesochariodes tablonica Razowski & Wojtusiak, 2009

See also
List of Tortricidae genera

References

External links
tortricidae.com

Tortricidae genera
Eucosmini
Taxa named by Józef Razowski